Shipwreck Secrets is a television series on the American network Science Channel.

See also
 List of 2020 American television debuts
 List of programs broadcast by Science Channel

References

https://www.smithsonianmag.com/smart-news/lost-ship-rediscovered-after-disappearing-near-bermuda-triangle-95-years-ago-180974109/
https://www.esquire.com/entertainment/a30730244/ss-cotopaxi-bermuda-triangle-shipwreck/

External links
 Shipwreck Secrets at Science Channel

2020 American television series debuts
Science Channel original programming